Élodie Le Bescond (born 12 February 1980) is a retired French professional tennis player. Le Bescond has a career high WTA singles ranking of 264, achieved on 11 June 2001. Le Bescond also has a career high WTA doubles ranking of 249 achieved on 29 April 2002. Le Bescond has won 2 ITF doubles titles. Le Bescond made her WTA main draw debut at the 2001 Internationaux de Tennis Feminin Nice in the doubles event partnering Anne-Laure Heitz. Le Bescond retired from professional tennis in 2007.

ITF Finals

Singles Finals (0–2)

Doubles Finals (2–2)

References

External links
 
 

1980 births
Living people
French female tennis players